William Keith, 9th Earl Marischal KT (c. 1664 – 27 May 1712, London) was a Scottish Jacobite politician and Earl Marischal of Scotland.

Life
His parents were the army officer George Keith, 8th Earl Marischal (d. 1694) and the courtier Lady Mary Hay (d. 1701), third daughter of the 2nd Earl of Kinnoull. Keith succeeded to the earldom in March 1694, swore loyalty to the de facto monarchy, took up his seat in Scotland's parliament in July 1698, was sworn into the privy council in June 1701 and made a knight of the Thistle by James Francis Edward Stuart in 1705. However, he was imprisoned in Edinburgh Castle for Jacobitism during the 1708 rising then sent to London for trial once it was over, but still managed to be made one of 16 representative peers at Westminster from 1710 to 1712. He was anti-Union and Tory in political sympathies and founded a medicine chair at Marischal College in Aberdeen (though he did not endow it). John Macky described him as:

Marriage and issue
Around 1690 Keith married the committed Jacobite Mary Drummond, daughter of James Drummond, 4th Earl of Perth (1648–1716), and his first wife, Lady Jane Douglas (d. 1678), the fourth daughter of William Douglas, 1st Marquess of Douglas. Mary thus did not join her father when he was exiled in 1693 for Jacobitism. Their children were:
George Keith, later tenth and last Earl Marischal (1692/93-1778)
James Francis Edward Keith (1696–1758), named after the 'Old Pretender'
Mary (d. 1721), married John, sixth earl of Wigtown
Anne (d. 1728), married Alexander, sixth earl of Galloway

Arms

Notes

External links
William Keith, 9th Earl Marischal on the website of the Dictionary of National Biography (subscription required)

1664 births
1712 deaths
Earls Marischal
Scottish Jacobites
Scottish representative peers
Knights of the Thistle